The Squash - Single Women competition at the World Games 2013 take place from 2 August to 4 August 2013 in Cali in Colombia, at the Canas Gordas Comfenalco Club.

Seeds

Draw

Note: * w/d = Withdraw, * w/o = Walkover, * r = Retired

References

Women
Squash records and statistics
2013 in women's squash